Ovia is a name. It may refer to:

Given name 
 Ovia Idah (1903–1968), Nigerian sculptor, painter, carpenter, designer, and educator

Surname 
 Jim Ovia (born 1951), Nigerian businessman
 John Ovia (born 1976), Papua New Guinean former cricketer
 Lucy Ovia (born 1967), Papua New Guinean former women's cricketer
 Tito Ovia (born 1994), Nigerian Health technology entrepreneur

Given names of African origin
Surnames of African origin